Thernstrom is a surname. Notable people with the surname include:

Abigail Thernstrom (1936–2020), American political scientist 
Melanie Thernstrom (born 1964), American crime writer
Stephan Thernstrom (born 1934), American historian